The Chumbi Valley, called Dromo or Tromo in Tibetan,
is a valley in the Himalayas that projects southwards from the Tibetan plateau, intervening between Sikkim and Bhutan. It is coextensive with the administrative unit Yadong County in the Tibet Autonomous Region of China. The Chumbi Valley is connected to Sikkim to the southwest via the mountain passes of Nathu La and Jelep La.

The valley supports some vegetation in the form of the Eastern Himalayan broadleaf forests and transitions to the Eastern Himalayan alpine shrub and meadows in the north. The plant Pedicularis chumbica (春丕马先蒿) is named after the valley.

The 1904 Younghusband Expedition of British India passed through the Chumbi Vally on its way to Lhasa. At the end of the expedition, the British took control of the Chumbi Valley in lieu of a war indemnity. China agreed to pay the indemnity owed by the Tibetans in three installments and the Chumbi Valley was transferred back to Tibet on 8 February 1908.

Name 
The Tibetan name of the region is spelt Gromo and pronounced Dromo or Tromo. 

In the Dzongkha language of Bhutan, the name is apparently written Gyumo and pronounced J'umo. J'umbi is said to be its adjective, meaning "of or pertaining to [J'umo]". 
Linguist George van Driem states that "Chumbi" is a derivative of J'umbi.

The term "Chumbi" to describe the region first appeared in the writings of Joseph Dalton Hooker, the first European to write about the region.
Some sources specialising in Tibet translate "Chumbi Valley" as Lho Dromo, or southern Dromo, implying that the northern part of the valley around Phari is not referred to by the name of Chumbi by the Tibetans. In the English usage, however, "Chumbi Valley" refers to both the parts.

"Chumbi" is also the name of the most prominent town in the southern part of the valley. Some English writers claim that "Chumbi Valley" is named after the town, but there is no such indication in Hooker's writings.

Geography 

Joseph Dalton Hooker described the Chumbi Valley as a triangular region with the broader opening to the north. It was said to be bounded on the west by the Chola Range upto "Gipmochi", and the "Kamphee or Chakoong range" on the east, which he believed to be continuous with "Chumulari" (Chomolhari). These names do not appear in later literature, but maps in mid-20th century mark the eastern border as the "Masang Kyungdu Range" (Map 2), with the Khundugang peak as its second prominent peak (after Chomolhari).

The Chumbi valley, belonging to Tibet (now part of PRC), is sandwiched between two Himalayan states: Sikkim to the west and Bhutan to the east. Sikkim and Bhutan are considered part of the Indian subcontinent or South Asia, with Sikkim now integrated as a state of India.

Strategic significance 

Scholar Susan Walcott counts China's Chumbi Valley and India's Siliguri Corridor to its south among "strategic mountain chokepoints critical in global power competition". John Garver has called the Chumbi Valley "the single most strategically important piece of real estate in the entire Himalayan region". The Chumbi Valley intervenes between Sikkim and Bhutan south of the high Himalayas, pointing towards India's Siliguri Corridor like a "dagger". The latter is a narrow 24 kilometer-wide corridor between Nepal and Bangladesh in India's West Bengal state, which connects the central parts of India with the northeastern states including the contested state of Arunachal Pradesh. Often referred to as the "chicken's neck", the Siliguri Corridor represents a strategic vulnerability for India.  It is also of key strategic significance to Bhutan, containing the main supply routes into the country.

Historically, both Siliguri and Chumbi Valley were part of a highway of trade between India and Tibet. In the 19th century, the British Indian government sought to open up the route to British trade, leading to their suzerainty over Sikkim with its strategic Nathu La and Jelep La passes into the Chumbi Valley. Following the Anglo-Chinese treaty of 1890 and Younghusband expedition, the British established trading posts at Yatung and Lhasa, along with military detachments to protect them. These trade relations continued till 1959, when the Chinese government terminated them. 

Indian intelligence officials state that China had been carrying out a steady military build-up in the Chumbi Valley, building many garrisons and converting the valley into a strong military base. In 1967, border clashes occurred at Nathu La and Cho La passes, when the Chinese contested the Indian demarcations of the border on the Dongkya range. In the ensuing artillery fire, states scholar Taylor Fravel, many Chinese fortifications were destroyed as the Indians controlled the high ground. In fact, the Chinese military is believed to be in a weak position in the Chumbi Valley because the Indian and Bhutanese forces control the heights surrounding the valley.

The desire for heights is thought to bring China to the Doklam plateau at the southern border of the Chumbi Valley. Indian security experts mention three strategic benefits to China from a control of the Doklam plateau. First, it gives it a commanding view of the Chumbi valley itself. Second, it outflanks the Indian defences in Sikkim which are currently oriented northeast towards the Dongkya range. Third, it overlooks the strategic Siliguri Corridor to the south. A claim to the Mount Gipmochi and the Zompelri ridge would bring the Chinese to the very edge of the Himalayas, from where the slopes descend into the southern foothills of Bhutan and India. From here, the Chinese would be able to monitor the Indian troop movements in the plains or launch an attack on the vital Siliguri corridor in the event of a war. To New Delhi, this represents a "strategic redline". Scholar Caroline Brassard states, "its strategic significance for the Indian military is obvious."

History 

There is telltale evidence of the Chumbi Valley being used as a trade route between Tibet and India in the first millennium CE. A lotsawa named Yontendrak (Yon tan grags, b. 973) is said to have been given control over the road to India by an Indian teacher "Aryadeva". The mention of this fact occurs in texts from the 14th century. A more graphic development is stated under the name of a Sakya governor Phakpa Balzang ('Phags-pa-dpal-bzang) in the mid-14th century, who is said to have invited 150 chiefs and teachers from Paro, Haa and other places for a feast in Phari and have them all killed. After this, these regions came under his control and he is said to have constructed a dzong and trade marts at Phari, appointing his younger brother Phakpa Rinchen (’Phags-pa-rin-chen) as the first district governor. There is no further mention of control over western Bhutan after this, but the Phari trade mart has persisted well into the 18th century.

According to the Sikkimese tradition, when the Kingdom of Sikkim was founded in 1642, it included the Chumbi Valley, the Haa Valley to the east as well as the Darjeeling and Kalimpong areas to the south. During the 18th century, Sikkim faced repeated raids from Bhutan and these areas often changed hands. After a Bhutanese attack in 1780, a settlement was reached, which resulted in the transfer of the Haa valley and the Kalimpong area to Bhutan. The Doklam plateau sandwiched between these regions is likely to have been part of these territories. The Chumbi Valley was still said to have been under the control of Sikkim at this point.

Historians qualify this narrative, Saul Mullard states that the early kingdom of Sikkim was very much limited to the western part of modern Sikkim. The eastern part was under the control of independent chiefs, who did face border conflicts with the Bhutanese, losing the Kalimpong area.  The possession of the Chumbi Valley by the Sikkimese is uncertain, but the Tibetans are known to have fended off Bhutanese incursions there.

After the unification of Nepal under the Gorkhas in 1756, Nepal and Bhutan had coordinated their attacks on Sikkim. Bhutan was eliminated from the contest by an Anglo-Bhutanese treaty in 1774. Tibet enforced a settlement between Sikkim and Nepal, which is said to have irked Nepal. Following this, by 1788, Nepal occupied all of the Sikkim areas to the west of the Teesta river as well as four provinces of Tibet. Tibet eventually sought the help of China, resulting in the Sino-Nepalese War of 1792. This proved to be a decisive entry of China into the Himalayan politics. The victorious Chinese General ordered a land survey, in the process of which the Chumbi valley was declared as part of Tibet.  The Sikkimese  resented the losses forced on them in the aftermath of the war.

In the following decades, Sikkim established relations with the British East India Company and regained some of its lost territory after an Anglo-Nepalese War. However, the relations with the British remained rocky and the Sikkimese retained loyalties to Tibet. The British attempted to enforce their suzerainty via the Treaty of Tumlong in 1861. In 1890, they sought to exclude the Tibetans from Sikkim by establishing a treaty with the Chinese, who were presumed to be exercising suzerainty over Tibet. The Anglo-Chinese treaty recognised Sikkim as a British protectorate and defined the border between Sikkim and Tibet as the northern watershed of the Teesta River (on the Dongkya range), starting at "Mount Gipmochi".  In 1904, the British signed another treaty with Tibet, which confirmed the terms of the Anglo-Chinese treaty. The boundary established between Sikkim and Tibet in the treaty still survives today, according to scholar John Prescott.

See also
Nathu La and Cho La clashes

Notes

References

Bibliography

 Scholarly sources
 
 
 
 
 
 
 
 
 
 
 
 
 
 
 
 
 
 
 
 
 

 Primary sources

External links

Valleys of Tibet
Yadong County
British military occupations